Argyle Park is an area near North Central Columbus, Ohio, bounded by East Hudson Street on the north, Woodland Avenue on the east, East 17th and East 26th avenues on the south, and Billiter Boulevard on the west.

Schools 
Hamilton Elementary School
Linden-McKinley High School
Welcome Center High School

Neighborhoods in Columbus, Ohio